Peter Hood Ballantine Frelinghuysen Jr. (January 17, 1916 – May 23, 2011) was an American politician and attorney. He represented New Jersey's fifth congressional district in the United States House of Representatives as a Republican from 1953 to 1975.

Early life and education
Frelinghuysen was born in New York City to Peter H. B. Frelinghuysen and the former Adaline Havemeyer. Frelinghuysen's father was a banker who descended from 18th century Dutch settlers in Somerset County. His siblings included his twin brother Henry O.H. Frelinghuysen, a philanthropist and civic leader, George G. Frelinghuysen, and Frederica Frelinghuysen Emert.

He came from a long line of New Jersey politicians dating back to the early years of the United States, including four United States senators and two House members. He was the grandson of George Griswold Frelinghuysen, great-grandson of Frederick T. Frelinghuysen, the great-great-nephew of Theodore Frelinghuysen, and the great-great-great-grandson of Frederick Frelinghuysen. He was also a great-great-grandson of Ballantine Brewery founder Peter Ballantine.

Frelinghuysen attended St. Mark's School in Southborough, Massachusetts, before graduating from Princeton University in 1938 and Yale Law School in 1941.

Career
After practicing law in New York City, he served in the Office of Naval Intelligence from September 1942 to December 1945 obtaining the rank of lieutenant. He then studied at Columbia University, 1946–1947. He served as staff of the Foreign Affairs Task Force of the Hoover Commission in 1948 before returning to the private sector. He served as director of Howard Savings Bank in Livingston, New Jersey.

U.S. Congress
In 1952, he was elected to the House of Representatives from New Jersey's 5th congressional district and served there until his retirement from politics in 1975. As a moderate Republican, Frelinghuysen voted in favor of the Civil Rights Acts of 1957, 1960, 1964, and 1968, as well as the 24th Amendment to the U.S. Constitution and the Voting Rights Act of 1965, but not the Johnson administration's War on Poverty programs.

In December 1959, when the Port of New York Authority's plans to develop a tract of woodlands and marsh near his estate in Morris County as an international airport serving the New York City region were exposed, Frelinghuysen participated in the opposition by the Jersey Jetport Site Association that was composed of local residents and conservationists, which raised funds to purchase almost 3,000 acres of the targeted site and donated it to the federal government, to be preserved forever as park lands. With the defeat of the airport development initiative, that parcel became the initial portion of the Great Swamp National Wildlife Refuge, established by federal statute on November 3, 1960, in the middle of the development controversy.

In January 1965, he was House Minority Leader Gerald Ford's choice for Minority Whip, but lost on a secret ballot of the Republican caucus by a vote of 70 to 59 to the incumbent Les Arends, who had held the post since 1943.

1966 blackmail incident
In 1966, extortionists targeted Frelinghuysen for blackmail, arranging for him to have a sexual encounter with an underage male and then, posing as police officers, threatening him with public exposure. Frelinghuysen paid them $50,000. He later cooperated with the FBI's investigation of the extortionist ring, but the Justice Department notified the leadership of the House of Representatives and Frelinghuysen was forced off the Armed Services Committee.

Later life
After leaving Congress, Frelinghuysen served on the boards of several nonprofit institutions, including the Metropolitan Museum of Art and the New York Botanical Garden.

Personal life
He married the former Beatrice Sterling Procter, in Stockbridge, Massachusetts, on September 7, 1940. She was a descendant of the founder of Procter & Gamble. Their children include Peter Frelinghuysen II, a lawyer, and Rodney P. Frelinghuysen, a former congressman. They lived in a 20-room Georgian Colonial home on 32 acres in Harding Township, New Jersey, designed by James W. O'Connor in 1948.

His wife died in 1996. He died on May 23, 2011, at his home in Harding Township, New Jersey.

Notes

References

External links
 
Peter H.B. Frelinghuysen Papers at the Seeley G. Mudd Manuscript Library, Princeton University
 

1916 births
2011 deaths
People from Harding Township, New Jersey
Princeton University alumni
Yale Law School alumni
Peter
Havemeyer family
American people of Dutch descent
St. Mark's School (Massachusetts) alumni
United States Navy officers
People of the Office of Naval Intelligence
Republican Party members of the United States House of Representatives from New Jersey
Articles containing video clips
20th-century American politicians
American people of German descent
American people of Scottish descent